Maria Antonia Braile was an Italian-arbëreshë writer and the first Albanian woman writer to ever publish literature in Albanian. She was born in San Demetrio Corone in Calabria. Braile published in 1917 in Calabria, Italy, a collection of poems in Arbëresh language, entitled Canti.

Braile is part of the Albanian world of poetry. Her poetry is simple and melancholic. She will be remembered as the first Albanian poetess.

References

Albanian women writers
Albanian writers
20th-century Albanian women writers
Italian people of Arbëreshë descent
People of Calabrian descent
People from the Province of Cosenza
Year of birth missing
Year of death missing